Big Business is a 1937 American comedy film directed by Frank R. Strayer and starring Jed Prouty, Shirley Deane and Spring Byington. It was part of Twentieth Century Fox's Jones Family series of films. The film's art direction was by Chester Gore.

The Jones Family invest in an oil well.

Plot summary

Cast

References

Bibliography
 Bernard A. Drew. Motion Picture Series and Sequels: A Reference Guide. Routledge, 2013.

External links
 
 
 
 

1937 films
1937 comedy films
American comedy films
Films directed by Frank R. Strayer
20th Century Fox films
American black-and-white films
Films scored by Samuel Kaylin
1930s English-language films
1930s American films